First Row Features is an American anthology series that premiered on the television network Nickelodeon in February 1980 and continued to air until January 1982. It mainly carried British television films (mostly from the Children's Film Foundation) for children and family audiences, most of which were filmed in the 1950s–60s. It featured a claymation title sequence created in-house at Nickelodeon's temporary headquarters in Buffalo, New York. First Row Features was a predecessor to the similarly formatted Special Delivery, which debuted later in the same year and eventually replaced it.

Overview
The program featured made-for-TV films from the United Kingdom, which were selected by employees at Nickelodeon. In January 1982, the Gannett newspaper The Times described the show as a collection of "one hour feature films for children ranging from comedies and adventures to dramas and semi-documentaries." Although most of the content on First Row Features had been filmed and released in Europe decades earlier, the films were marketed as new to U.S. viewers. New films premiered on Mondays, Wednesdays, and Fridays. At the time of its creation, First Row Features was one of only five programs that were aired in a loop to fill the entire Nickelodeon schedule. It was non-commercial and advertisements were never played between features.

Films featured

See also
History of Nickelodeon

References

1980 American television series debuts
1982 American television series endings
1980s American children's television series
1980s Nickelodeon original programming
1980s American anthology television series
English-language television shows